Karim Patwa (born August 13, 1968) is a Swiss-English film director and screenwriter. He gained international attention especially through his film Drift, which won three prizes at the Max Ophüls Festival 2015 and the NDR-directing prize, and was also nominated for the Swiss Film Award 2015.

Life and career 
Karim Patwa grew up in Orpund. After school he did an apprenticeship as an electrical mechanic, at the same time he attended evening classes in photography at the Biel School of Design. Then he worked from 1989 to 1991 as a press photographer at the Bieler Tagblatt. From 1992 to 1996 Karim Patwa studied at the Lucerne School of Art and Design and graduated with the diploma of the faculty of video. Since then he has worked as a freelance film director and screenwriter. His creations include music videos, commercials and short films.

Filmography

Feature Film 
 2015: Drift

Video 
 2004: Karim Patwa's Spaceship

Shorts 
 1996: ON-OFF
 1997: Unglaublich aber war
 1999: Der AV-Werkstattsupporter
 2002: Heartcore
 2007: High Above Ground
 2007: Die Chronomanen
 2008: Brüder

Music Videos 
 ADO – All tomorrows birthday partys
 Züri West – One more blues
 Salmonella Q – Kill the DJ

External links 

 Official website
 
 Karim Patwa at the Swiss Films website

References 

1968 births
Living people
Swiss film directors
British film directors
Swiss screenwriters
Male screenwriters
British screenwriters
German-language film directors